To kill time is to be idle.

Kill Time may refer to:
Kill Time (film) 2016 Chinese film
Kill Time Communication Japanese adult comic publisher
"Kill Time", a song by The Clash from the album Combat Rock 1982